Oliver Crewe (27 February 1947 – 2 May 2020) was a Gaelic footballer who played for the Clan na Gael and Dowdallshill clubs and at senior level for the Armagh county team.

Career

Crewe first came to Gaelic football prominence as a schoolboy with St Paul's Junior High School, which subsequently formed the backbone of the Clan na Gael club team. After progressing through the underage ranks to the senior team, Crewe was a member of the Clan team that lost the 1974 All-Ireland club final to University College Dublin. His other honours at club level include three Ulster Club Championships and seven Armagh SFC titles. Crewe first appeared on the inter-county scene with the Armagh minor football team. He spent a number of seasons with the senior team between 1968 and 1974. Crewe ended his playing days with the Dowdallshill club.

Death
Crewe died from COVID-19 at Dealgan House Nursing Home in Dundalk on 2 May 2020, aged 73.

Honours
Clan na Gael
Ulster Senior Club Football Championship: 1972, 1973, 1974
Armagh Senior Football Championship: 1968, 1969, 1971, 1972, 1973, 1974, 1976
Armagh Intermediate Football Championship: 1965

References

1947 births
2020 deaths
Armagh inter-county Gaelic footballers
Clan na Gael CLG Gaelic footballers
Deaths from the COVID-19 pandemic in the Republic of Ireland
Gaelic football backs